The United States of America has sent athletes to every celebration of the modern Olympic Games with the exception of the 1980 Summer Olympics, during which it led a boycott in protest of the Soviet invasion of Afghanistan. The United States Olympic & Paralympic Committee (USOPC) is the National Olympic Committee for the United States.

American athletes have won a total of 2,629 medals (1,060 of them gold) at the Summer Olympic Games, and another 330 (113 of them gold) at the Winter Olympic Games, making the United States the most prolific medal-winning nation in the history of the Olympics. The United States remains one of the only major teams in the world to receive no government funding.

Hosted Games

The United States has hosted or was the designated host of the modern Olympic Games on nine occasions, more than any other nation:

Unsuccessful bids

Medal tables

The United States made its Olympic debut in 1896 in Athens, the very first edition of the modern games. The nation performed inconsistently in the pre-World War-I period, primarily due to fielding considerably fewer athletes than host countries, with the exception being the 1904 Olympics in St. Louis, Missouri, where the U.S. achieved its greatest medal haul in history, a record that still stands today. During the interwar period, the U.S. enjoyed its most success, topping both gold and total medal counts at four straight Summer Games, before falling short in the 1936 Berlin games. The next summer Olympics were held in 1948 following World War II. In 1952, the Soviet Union made its Olympic debut, initiating a state-sponsored approach to international sport focused on projecting socio-political superiority. The rapid rise of the Soviet Union to challenge the United States as a leading Olympic power raised questions and suspicion about the means used to achieve this, including the pretense of professional athletes having amateur status and allegations of state-sponsored doping. After 20 years of competition on the Olympic stage, the USSR convincingly topped the medal chart at the 1972 Summer Olympics in Munich. After that, the U.S. would not top the medal table in non-boycotted games until the 1996 Summer Olympics, five years after the USSR collapsed. A bright spot for the United States was the 1984 games in Los Angeles, where the U.S. set a record for most gold medals won in a single Olympics (83), buoyed by the Soviet-led boycott. Coincident with a drive by the International Olympic Committee toward gender parity beginning in the 1990s, the U.S.’s fortunes improved, and the nation topped the medal table in the Summer Olympics six times since 1992 and placed second on two occasions.

In contrast to its summer Olympics status, the United States was not a power in the Winter Games until the 2002 Olympics in Salt Lake City. Hosting the games in 2002 boosted the U.S. winter sports program; since then, the country’s athletes have performed consistently well, never placing below fourth in the medal count. The nation won the most medals (37) at the 2010 Winter Olympics in Vancouver but dropped to 23 medals at the most recent 2018 games in Pyeongchang.

Medals by Summer Games

Medals by Winter Games

Medals by summer sport

Updated on December 31, 2021

*This table does not include two medals – one silver awarded in the ice hockey and one bronze awarded in the figure skating events at the 1920 Summer Olympics.

The United States has never won an Olympic medal in the following current summer sports or disciplines: badminton, handball, rhythmic gymnastics, table tennis and trampoline gymnastics.

Medals by winter sport

Updated on December 31, 2021

*This table includes two medals – one silver awarded in the ice hockey and one bronze awarded in the figure skating events at the 1920 Summer Olympics.

The United States has never won an Olympic medal in the following current winter sport: biathlon.

Best results in non-medaling sports:

Flagbearers

History

Early Olympics (1896–1912)

The very first modern Olympic Games that were held in Athens, Greece saw the Americans fielding 14 athletes that competed in three sports. The hosts, on the other hand, had 169 athletes competing and won 46 medals. The American team did its best, but managed to grab only 20 medals, being dwarfed by an enormous Greek team. However, the United States managed to get the most gold medals, 11, edging Greece that secured 10 golds. That allowed Team USA to finish first in the gold medal tally. James Connolly became the first modern Olympic champion by winning the triple jump, and Thomas Burke grabbed three gold medals in various track events, assuming the title of the most successful athlete of the 1896 Games.

At the 1900 Paris Olympics, the US team featured 75 athletes, a significant increase compared to 1896, but still considerably less than the French hosts that fielded 720 competitors. The most notable of all American participants was Margaret Abbott who became the first female American Olympic champion by winning the women's golf. The vast majority of American medals were won in the sport of athletics where US athletes clinched 16 gold and 39 medals overall. Team USA won only 8 medals outside of track, four of them in golf. Overall, France dominated the medal standings, winning 29 gold and 112 total medals. The United States ranked second with 19 and 48, respectively, showing great efficiency, despite having significantly less athletes.

The 1904 Summer Olympics in St. Louis, Missouri were the first ever Olympic Games held outside of Europe.

Interwar period (1920–1936)

Jesse Owens achieved international fame at the 1936 Summer Olympics in Berlin, Germany by winning four gold medals: in the 100 meters, long jump, 200 meters, and 4 × 100-meter relay, disproving the Nazi theory of Aryan racial superiority in the process.

Cold War era (1948–1992)

The 1948 London Olympics marked the first time that the newly communist countries, that were occupied by the Soviet Union after WW2, competed in the games. The Soviets themselves declined to compete, sending only observers, after a long hesitation that saw Soviet leader Joseph Stalin demanding guarantees from his sports officials that the USSR would beat the US in the medal standings. The Soviet officials told him that chances were 50/50, and Stalin ultimately rejected the idea of competing in 1948. With its newest political rival absent, the United States comfortably dominated the games, winning 38 gold and 84 total medals, 22 gold and 40 total medals more than the runner-up Sweden. The most medals were won in track and field, 27, and swimming, 15. The US basketball team won its second consecutive gold medal, defeating France in the final, 65–21.

In 1952, Helsinki saw the Soviets sending a team for the first time. This was a beginning of a new era, as the Soviet Union would go on to dominate the Olympics for the next four decades. The Soviets viewed the Olympics as international battlefield, where they can achieve their political goals by winning medals, thus proving their system's superiority. The Soviet authorities also significantly bent the amateur rules, that were in place at the time, by providing state-funding to their athletes who trained full-time and, unlike American self-financed amateurs, were de facto professionals. That would start a significant controversy, that will result in the amateur rules being abolished, though only in the 1990s, after the collapse of the Soviet Union, meaning that the Soviets benefited from those rules throughout their Olympic history. The United States still topped the medal count at these games, winning 40 gold and 76 total medals, 22 gold and 5 total medals more than the Soviets who finished second. American athletes won 31 medals in track and field, their most successful sport. US basketball team won its third consecutive gold, twice defeating the Soviets in the process, American boxers won all five finals they entered, and American weightlifters edged their Soviet rivals 4 to 3 in terms of gold medals, with the two nations sweeping all seven events in the sport.

Melbourne hosted the Olympics in 1956. There were calls for the expulsion of the Soviet Union following their invasion of Hungary, but the International Olympic Committee decided not to pursue any action. As a result, some nations boycotted the games in protest of the Soviets' presence, and the Hungarians themselves became engaged in a violent brawl with their Soviet counterparts in a water polo game, an event that was instantly called Blood in the Water. The US performance at the games was relatively successful, though it was getting harder and harder to compete with the Soviet machine. As a result, the Americans earned 32 gold and 78 total medals (second place in the medal standings), 5 gold and 24 total medals less than the first-placed Soviets. The US contingent was particularly successful in track and field, where American athletes amassed 31 medals. On the other hand, the US won only 2 golds in swimming, being unable to stop the Australian domination of the swimming events at these games. In weightlifting, the Americans and Soviets once again won all seven events, once again with a 4 to 3 ratio in favor of the US team. In boxing, the Soviets won 3 golds, while the Americans only managed to win two events. However, it was gymnastics where the USSR achieved its greatest success, winning 11 out of 17 events and guaranteeing the first place in the medal rankings. The US basketball team won its fourth consecutive gold, beating the Soviets in the final game, 89–55.

The 1960 Rome Olympics saw the Americans losing their grip on their traditionally successful sports, such as track and field and weightlifting. On the other hand, boxing, swimming (where the Americans won 9 gold medals, while being controversially denied gold in the 100 meters freestyle, despite showing the best time), and wrestling produced unexpectedly good results, which somewhat helped to compensate for what was lost in other sports. In track and field, the Soviets won 11 golds, only one less than the Americans. It is worth mentioning that the US team encountered many problems throughout the meet, such as a controversial disqualification of their gold medal-winning men's 4x100 relay team. In weightlifting, the Soviets, with the help of their state-of-the-art doping program, won five out of seven events, leaving the US with only one gold. 10 Soviet golds in gymnastics didn't surprise anyone, as the nation had always been a gymnastics powerhouse, but it did mean that the Soviets beat the Americans in the medal standings for the second straight summer games. The US basketball team, however, met the pre-tournament expectations and won its fifth consecutive gold medal, a noble feat, given that they had to compete against veteran pros from the USSR. The final result, 43 gold and 103 total medals for the Soviets to 34 gold and 71 total medals for the Americans, showed that America was no longer a leading force in Olympic competition.

There was some redemption for the US at the 1964 Summer Olympics in Tokyo, as the nation returned to the top of the gold medal count for the first time since 1952. Particularly successful was the US swimming team that won 13 out of available 18 golds and shattered 9 world records. In track and field, the Americans also improved on their 1960 performance, winning 14 gold and 24 total medals, while the Soviets left Japan with 5 gold and 18 total medals, a significant downturn compared to their 1960 results. The Soviets, however, continued to dominate Olympic weightlifting, and, with the American program falling apart, the USSR produced four golds and three silvers. The Soviet Union hoped to replicate that success in gymnastics and wrestling, the sports that, together with weightlifting, were strongly associated with their athletic prowess. However, they encountered a zealous resistance from the Japanese, who used their home-field advantage to stun the Soviets, beating them five to three in wrestling golds, and winning five gymnastics championships to their four. Thus, Japan had a major influence on the US–USSR medals race, and most certainly helped the Americans edge their biggest rivals, while also managing to produce its best ever medal output and finishing in third place. For the Americans, despite their dismal performance in boxing where they achieved only one gold, the 1964 Olympics were a definite success, with the nation winning 36 gold and 90 total medals compared to the Soviet tally of 30 gold and 96 total medals. Therefore, the US topped the gold medal count, finishing second in the total medal count, while the USSR topped the total medal count, finishing second in the gold medal count. The US basketball team won its sixth consecutive gold, beating the Soviets in the final, 73–59.

The 1968 Mexico Olympics became the most successful summer games for the US in the post-war era. American athletes amassed 45 gold and 107 total medals, 16 gold and 16 total medals more than the second-placed Soviets. The US swimming team dominated the competition, winning a staggering 51 medals and sweeping the podium on five occasions. The Americans also managed to medal in every single of 29 swimming events, thus achieving a unique feat. The US track and field team pulled off a stellar performance as well with 15 gold and 28 total medals. Overall, swimming and athletics accounted for more than 70% of all US medals and ensured the first place in the medal table for the Americans, their second consecutive first-place finish in terms of gold medals, and their first finish at the top of the overall medal table since 1952. In other sports, however, the performance of American athletes was less convincing. The US weightlifting team continued to fade away, winning just one medal (compared to 7 in 1956), American boxers won 7 medals, though only two of them gold, US divers won 6 medals, and the men's volleyball team managed to stun the defending champions from the Soviet Union, beating them in five sets, but still finished out of medals; Soviets ultimately won gold, with their lone loss being to the US. In gymnastics, Japan continued to frustrate the Soviets, once again surpassing them in the medal standings. Last but not least, the US basketball team won its seventh consecutive gold medal, a feat not matched by any other Olympic team in ball sports. Very few would have assumed that this was the last time that the US finished first in the medal table in a fully attended Summer Olympics until 1996 (the Americans would top the medal standings in 1984 with the Soviet Union and its satellites boycotting).

The Munich Olympics saw the Soviet Union begin its streak of topping the medal count at five consecutive summer games in which they participated (1972–1992, though in 1992 they would compete as the Unified Team as the USSR dissolved half a year prior to the games, and the newly independent countries decided to compete together). The sporting nature of the event was largely overshadowed by the Munich massacre in the second week, in which eleven Israeli athletes and coaches and a West German police officer at Olympic village were killed by Black September terrorists. There were multiple calls to cancel the games after the terrorist attack, but the IOC declined. From a sporting standpoint, these games were one of the most controversial in history, with many accusing the organizing committee of anti-Americanism and trying to appease the Soviet Union and East Germany. Indeed, these were one of the strangest Olympics ever for American athletes. US world record holders in the 100 meters were given the wrong starting time and were unable to compete in the event, thus paving the way for a Soviet to win. In swimming, the US gold medal winner in the 400 meters freestyle was stripped of his medal for using his prescription asthma medication, also depriving him of a chance at multiple medals. US boxers complained that they were judged unfairly in the bouts against their communist counterparts. In shooting, a US athlete initially won the 50 meters rifle only to be relegated to silver after a "review". Finally, in the most controversial event of the games, and one of the most controversial events of all time, the US basketball team was denied gold after apparently winning the final match against the Soviet Union. The final three seconds of the game were replayed three times until the Soviets came out on top. The Americans did not accept the silver medals, believing that they were robbed. This was the first US loss in Olympic basketball history and it ended the Americans' 63-game winning streak in Olympic basketball. In general, the US team greatly underperformed at these games, winning only 6 gold medals in track and field to the East Germans' 8 and Soviets' 9, though the Americans still won the most total medals, 22. In boxing, the Cubans and Soviets dominated, winning three and two championships, respectively, while the US won only one gold and four medals overall (compared to the Soviets' two and Cubans' five). In diving, the Americans won three medals; in soccer, the USSR and GDR fixed a bronze medal game, playing a tie, so both teams received bronze; in gymnastics, the Soviets edged their old rivals Japan to top the medal count; in weightlifting, the Soviets and Bulgarians won three golds each; in wrestling, the US team surprised with three golds in freestyle, yet the Soviets still dwarfed their medal tally with nine golds in freestyle and Greco-Roman (14–6 in total medals). In water polo, the Americans struck bronze, tying the eventual gold medalists the Soviet Union in the final round. Swimming was the only sport where the American team did not disappoint, winning 17 gold and 43 total medals, a good result, but still less than four years earlier. American women dominated swimming for the last time until 1992, as by 1976 they would be overtaken by East German dopers.

The Eastern Bloc dominated the 1976 Montreal Olympics, with seven countries placing in the top ten of the medal table. The United States team was relegated to a third place in the medal standings for the first time in its history. This was an Olympics of contrasts: the US men's swimming team, despite the generally dismal showing of the overall delegation, swept 12 gold and 27 total medals in the 13 events that were on the program and broke 11 world records in the process (arguably the most dominant performance of any swimming team in history), while the US women's swimming team, on the other hand, fell victim to what was later shown to be a pervasive East German doping program. They still managed to win a gold medal, in an upset of the East Germans in the 4x100 freestyle relay. The event was held on the last day of the swimming program, and the American women were risking being deprived of gold for the first time in US Olympic history. The victory was somewhat overlooked at the time, but since the early 1990s, when public revelation of the doping program began, their gold medal is considered to be one of the most improbable upsets of all time. In track and field, both the US men's and women's team were overwhelmed by East Germans who secured a bulk of medals in the signature sports of the US, resulting in the USSR topping the medal table. The US boxing team surprised everyone, advancing to six gold medal bouts and winning five of them, drawing parallels to a stellar 1952 team that also took five golds. The achievement was even more notable due to the fact that the American boxers were significantly younger and less experienced than their Cuban and Soviet counterparts. In other sports, US divers won five medals, including two golds; the US equestrian team took home four medals; American shooters won three medals, including a historic silver by a woman in the mixed 50 meters rifle three positions; US freestyle wrestlers advanced to four gold medal bouts, yet won only one of them (all four were against the Soviets), concluding the meet with six medals overall. The US men's basketball team reclaimed the gold medal, while the women's team won a surprising silver, being ranked no higher than sixth prior to the start of the tournament. The Soviets and East Germans were unstoppable in canoeing, gymnastics, rowing, weightlifting and wrestling, going 1–2 in the overall medal standings (49 gold and 125 total medals for the Soviets, and 40 gold and 90 total medals for East Germans). The US won medals in 14 sports, finishing third with 34 gold and 94 total medals. The most successful day for the Americans was July 31 when they won 8 gold and 18 total medals.

The 1980 Summer Olympics marked another first for the United States, as the nation led by far the largest and most significant boycott in the Olympic history. The boycott was motivated by the 1979 Soviet invasion of Afghanistan, as well as by flagrant human rights violations in the USSR, and the regime's anti-Semitic policies. The Soviet state-run media ridiculed the Americans as sore losers who couldn't get over the fact that they were no longer a perennial Olympic power, and simply didn't want to be embarrassed by the Soviets who would thrash them in the medal count. Indeed, all medal predictions pointed to an inevitable Soviet victory with 55–60 gold medals. East Germans were forecast to win 40–45 gold medals, while the Americans would wind up in third place with 30–35 golds. However, the world would never know what would have happened, as the United States and 65 other countries chose not to attend the Moscow Games, leaving them with the smallest attendance since 1956. Predictably, the great majority of the medals were taken by the host country and East Germany in what was the most skewed medal tally since 1904. The Soviets amassed 80 gold (all-time record) and 195 total (second-best result after the US in 1904) medals in their anticlimactic performance.

In 1984, Los Angeles witnessed what was considered a retaliatory boycott by the Soviets and their satellites, although the Soviets cited security concerns and "chauvinistic sentiments and an anti-Soviet hysteria being whipped up in the United States." However, no threat to Eastern Bloc athletes was ever discovered, and the athletes from the Eastern Bloc country that did attend the 1984 games in Los Angeles—Romania—encountered no problems, and in fact were widely cheered above all other visiting nations at the Opening Ceremonies when they marched into the Coliseum (Romania ended up finishing third in overall medal count at the Games). The move by the Soviets left many "dumbfounded", as it was expected that they would try to thrash the US on their soil, thus achieving a significant propaganda victory. The forecasts again heavily favored the Soviet Union, with the Soviet athletes being expected to rack up 60–65 gold medals compared to 35–45 by the second-placed Americans. That didn't happen. Furthermore, despite the Soviet boycott, a record 140 nations (including China that participated for the first time since 1952) attended the games.

There were fears that the Soviet Union would boycott the 1988 Summer Olympics in Seoul as well because South Korea had no diplomatic relations with the USSR, which recognized and supported only North Korea. However, the policies of Perestroika that were initiated by Gorbachev in 1985 led to the Soviet participation in the games. Cuba, clearly not understanding such a betrayal, decided to boycott the Olympics on its own, impacting the boxing field as a result. The Soviet Union was steadily moving towards its ultimate collapse but its sporting empire was still in its prime. The Soviets and their close allies from East Germany utterly dominated the games, winning 55 and 37 gold medals respectively (132 and 102 total medals).

During the Cold War period the Americans did their best to challenge the Soviets, but the playing field wasn't level. The Soviet athletes were funded by the state and trained full-time, while the US strictly obeyed the amateur rules, and its athletes were primarily self-financed students who were significantly younger and less experienced than the Soviet veterans. In addition to that, the Soviets developed a state-sponsored doping system, and supplied performance-enhancing drugs to the vast majority of their athletes. Furthermore, they heavily invested in the development of a similar system in their satellite nation, East Germany, with a specific goal of making East Germans highly competitive in swimming and track and field, so that they can reduce the number of medals the Americans win in their signature sports. Unfortunately for the US, the Soviet strategy worked, and the gap between the USSR and US widened every four years until the collapse of the Soviet Union. In 1972, the Soviets won 50 gold and 99 total medals to the Americans' 33 and 94; in 1976, the USSR amassed 49 gold and 125 total medals to the Americans' 34 and 94; 1980 Olympics were boycotted by the US and its allies, the Soviets retaliated in 1984 by boycotting the LA Olympics together with their satellites; finally, in 1988, the USSR won 55 gold and 132 total medals to the Americans' 36 and 94 (the US finished third at those games, losing even to the East Germans). In 1992, the Soviets still fielded a team despite the dissolution of their state, yet the margin of their victory over the Americans became narrower: 45 gold and 112 total medals to the Americans' 37 and 108. By 1996, every former Soviet republic formed its own National Olympic Committee, and the countries participated as independent nations, with Russia assuming the Soviet place in the IOC and inheriting Soviet achievements as by far the largest of the former Soviet republics. So, in 1996, the Americans finally managed to return to the top spot in the medal rankings, winning 44 gold and 101 total medals compared to 26 gold and 63 total medals won by the second-placed Russians, thanks to the partial abolition of the amateur rules in the early 1990s (the American athletes still weren't state-sponsored, unlike their foreign counterparts, but they were now eligible for prize money and sponsorships). They were still disadvantaged by these rules in those sports where they weren't abolished (i.e., boxing, baseball, where Cubans continued to field state-sponsored pros against American amateurs), but the situation started improving.

Modern period (1994–present)

U.S. athletes have appeared in every Summer Olympics of the modern era. The United States, represented by the United States Olympic & Paralympic Committee (USOPC), competed at the 2020 Summer Olympics in Tokyo. Originally scheduled to take place in the summer of 2020, the Games were postponed to July 23 to August 8, 2021, due to the COVID-19 pandemic. The opening ceremony flag-bearers for the United States were baseball player Eddy Alvarez and basketball player Sue Bird. Javelin thrower Kara Winger was the flag-bearer for the closing ceremony. When USA Gymnastics announced that 2016 Olympic all-around champion Biles would not participate in the gymnastics all-around final, the spotlight fell on her American team-mates. The U.S. had won the event in each of the last five Olympic Games: a formidable winning streak was on the line. Sunisa Lee embraced the moment and stood tall to deliver for her country. She totaled 57.433 to hold off Rebeca Andrade of Brazil (57.298) to clinch the title. Lee also made history of her own. With victory in the all-around she became the first Hmong American gymnast to win an Olympic gold medal. With a silver in the women's team final and bronze in the individual uneven bars Lee left Tokyo with an impressive three Olympic medals. Lydia Jacoby Alaska's swimming sweetheart made history when she was the first Alaskan swimmer selected to make the U.S. Olympic swim team. She stunned the world to secure victory in the women's 100m breaststroke. Recent major champion Nelly Korda followed the winning ways of compatriot Xander Schauffele to take home gold in the women's golf competition. The 2.01m-tall thrower Ryan Crouser retained his Olympic title in the men's shot put and did so in some style, setting an Olympic record three times.

At the 2022 Winter Olympics, a total of 25 medals meant Team USA won two more medals than in 2018, although it still signifies an overall decline after 37 medals in 2010 and 28 in 2014. Notable successes included Jessie Diggins becoming the first American female skier to win individual cross-country medals, figure skater Nathan Chen breaking the short program world record on route to the Olympic gold medal in the men’s singles, Erin Jackson becoming the first black female athlete to win speed skating gold, and Chloe Kim defending her title in the snowboarding women’s halfpipe. Veteran snowboarder Lindsey Jacobellis, who last medaled in the 2006 Winter Olympics in Turin, was the only U.S. athlete with multiple gold medals, winning the women's snowboard cross event, and sharing the gold with teammate Nick Baumgartner in the mixed snowboard cross event.

Amateurism and professionalism

The exclusion of professionals caused several controversies throughout the history of the modern Olympics. The 1912 Olympic pentathlon and decathlon champion Jim Thorpe was stripped of his medals, when it was discovered that he had played semi-professional baseball before the Olympics. His medals were posthumously restored by the IOC in 1983 on compassionate grounds.

The advent of the state-sponsored "full-time amateur athlete" of the Eastern Bloc countries eroded the ideology of the pure amateur. It put the self-financed amateurs of the Western countries at a disadvantage. The Soviet Union entered teams of athletes who were all nominally students, soldiers, or working in a profession, but all of whom were in reality paid by the state to train on a full-time basis. The situation greatly disadvantaged American athletes, and was a major factor in the decline of American medal hauls in the 1970s and 1980s. As a result, the Olympics shifted away from amateurism, as envisioned by Pierre de Coubertin. They began allowing participation of professional athletes, but only in the 1990s, after the collapse of the Soviet Union and its influence within the International Olympic Committee.

Doping
United States has had eight Olympic medals stripped for doping violations. In all cases, the US government or the United States Olympic Committee (USOC) had nothing to do with it, and sanctioned athletes acted on their own. In the case of swimmer Rick DeMont, the USOC has recognized his gold medal performance in the 1972 Summer Olympics in 2001, but only the IOC has the power to restore his medal, and it has as of 2017 refused to do so. DeMont originally won the gold medal in 4:00.26. Following the race, the IOC stripped him of his gold medal after his post-race urinalysis tested positive for traces of the banned substance ephedrine contained in his prescription asthma medication, Marax. The positive test following the 400-meter freestyle final also deprived him of a chance at multiple medals, as he was not permitted to swim in any other events at the 1972 Olympics, including the 1,500-meter freestyle for which he was the then-current world record-holder. Before the Olympics, DeMont had properly declared his asthma medications on his medical disclosure forms, but the USOC had not cleared them with the IOC's medical committee.

In 2003, Wade Exum, the United States Olympic Committee's director of drug control administration from 1991 to 2000, gave copies of documents to Sports Illustrated that revealed that some 100 American athletes failed drug tests from 1988 to 2000, arguing that they should have been prevented from competing in the Olympics but were nevertheless cleared to compete; among those athletes were Carl Lewis, Joe DeLoach and Floyd Heard. Before showing the documents to Sports Illustrated, Exum tried to use them in a lawsuit against USOC, accusing the organization of racial discrimination and wrongful termination against him and cover-up over the failed tests. His case was summarily dismissed by the Denver federal Court for lack of evidence. The USOC claimed his case "baseless" as he himself was the one in charge of screening the anti-doping test program of the organization and clarifying that the athletes were cleared according to the rules.

Carl Lewis broke his silence on allegations that he was the beneficiary of a drugs cover-up, admitting he had failed tests for banned substances, but claiming he was just one of "hundreds" of American athletes who were allowed to escape bans, concealed by the USOC. Lewis has acknowledged that he failed three tests during the 1988 US Olympic trials, which under international rules at the time should have prevented him from competing in the 1988 Summer Olympics. Former athletes and officials came out against the USOC cover-up. "For so many years I lived it. I knew this was going on, but there's absolutely nothing you can do as an athlete. You have to believe governing bodies are doing what they are supposed to do. And it is obvious they did not," said former American sprinter and 1984 Olympic champion, Evelyn Ashford.

Exum's documents revealed that Carl Lewis had tested positive three times at the 1988 Olympics trials for minimum amounts of pseudoephedrine, ephedrine, and phenylpropanolamine, which were banned stimulants. Bronchodilators are also found in cold medication. Due to the rules, his case could have led to disqualification from the Seoul Olympics and suspension from competition for six months. The levels of the combined stimulants registered in the separate tests were 2 ppm, 4 ppm and 6 ppm. Lewis defended himself, claiming that he had accidentally consumed the banned substances. After the supplements that he had taken were analyzed to prove his claims, the USOC accepted his claim of inadvertent use, since a dietary supplement he ingested was found to contain "Ma Huang", the Chinese name for Ephedra (ephedrine is known to help weight loss). Fellow Santa Monica Track Club teammates Joe DeLoach and Floyd Heard were also found to have the same banned stimulants in their systems, and were cleared to compete for the same reason. The highest level of the stimulants Lewis recorded was 6 ppm, which was regarded as a positive test in 1988 but is now regarded as negative test. The acceptable level has been raised to ten parts per million for ephedrine and twenty-five parts per million for other substances. According to the IOC rules at the time, positive tests with levels lower than 10 ppm were cause of further investigation but not immediate ban. Neal Benowitz, a professor of medicine at UC San Francisco who is an expert on ephedrine and other stimulants, agreed that "These [levels] are what you'd see from someone taking cold or allergy medicines and are unlikely to have any effect on performance." Following Exum's revelations the IAAF acknowledged that at the 1988 Olympic Trials the USOC indeed followed the correct procedures in dealing with eight positive findings for ephedrine and ephedrine-related compounds in low concentration. Additionally, in 1988 the federation reviewed the relevant documents with the athletes' names undisclosed and stated that "the medical committee felt satisfied, however, on the basis of the information received that the cases had been properly concluded by the USOC as 'negative cases' in accordance with the rules and regulations in place at the time and no further action was taken".

Disqualified medalists

The United States has had eight Olympic medals stripped, which is fifth in the ranking of countries with the most stripped medals.

1972 Summer Olympics, Rick DeMont,	first place, gold medalist, Swimming, Men's 400 m freestyle
2000 Summer Olympics, Marion Jones, first place, gold medalist, Athletics, Women's 100 m
2000 Summer Olympics, Marion Jones, first place, gold medalist, Athletics, Women's 200 m
2000 Summer Olympics, Marion Jones, third place, bronze medalist, Athletics, Women's long jump
2000 Summer Olympics, Relay team (Antonio Pettigrew, Jerome Young), first place, gold medalists, Athletics, Men's 4 × 400 m relay	
2000 Summer Olympics, Lance Armstrong, third place, bronze medalist, Cycling, Men's road time trial
2004 Summer Olympics, Tyler Hamilton, first place, gold medalist, Cycling, Men's road time trial
2012 Summer Olympics, Relay team (Tyson Gay), second place, silver medalist, Athletics, Men's 4 × 100 m relay

Russia–United States rivalry

Russia (in all its incarnations) and the United States have won more Olympic medals than any other nation. Russia topped the overall medal count at seven Summer Olympics, and nine Winter Olympics, while the United States placed first at eighteen Summer Olympics, and one Winter Olympics. The countries developed a strong rivalry during the Cold War. While the tensions eased in the 1990s, the relations deteriorated in 2014 and 2016.

Since the 1952 Summer Olympics, the United States has won 1,986 Summer and Winter Olympics medals, the most in that period, while Russia has won 1,973 medals, the second most in that period.

Summer Olympics
Medal totals of the Soviet Union/Unified Team/Russia/ROC and the United States since 1952, when the Soviet Union started to compete at the Summer Games.

Overall, the United States (1896–1976, 1984–present) has won 1,061 gold and 2,636 total medals, and Russia (1900, 1908–1912, 1952—1980, 1988–present) has won 610 gold and 1,627 total medals.

Winter Olympics
Medal totals of the Soviet Union/Unified Team/Russia/Olympic Athletes from Russia and the United States since 1956, when the Soviet Union started to compete at the Winter Games.

Overall, the United States (1924–present) has won 113 gold and 330 total medals, and Russia (1956–present) has won 142 gold and 376 total medals.

Basketball

1972 Olympics

The United States and Soviet Union sporting adversary reached its peak during the Cold War. The U.S. men's team was considered a favorite in the run-up to the 1972 Games. Since the first Olympic basketball tournament at the 1936 Olympics in Berlin, the Americans hadn't lost a single game, winning seven consecutive gold medals in a dominating fashion. Their record reached an unprecedented 63-0 before the final game. Since the 1952 tournament, the Soviet team challenged the Americans, winning silver in 1952, 1956, 1960, and 1964, and bronze in 1968. Outside of the Olympics, the Soviets had already defeated the U.S. team in the World Championship play. However, the Americans never sent their best collegiate players to that tournament.

It is important to note that the Olympics strictly prohibited any involvement of professional athletes at the time. The Soviet Union and other Eastern Bloc countries used that rule to their advantage, listing all its top players as soldiers or workers, which allowed them to breach the amateur rules. Western experts classified these athletes as professionals. On the other hand, leading American players were unable to play in the Olympics, as they were officially professional and played in the NBA. That disadvantage hadn't prevented the Americans from winning, as they won the first seven Olympic basketball tournaments without a single defeat.

The confrontation of the Soviet Union and United States on the basketball court was deeply connected to the confrontation on the political front. Many American viewers assumed that 1972 Games were openly anti-American. There were rumors that the Communist party had bribed the officials, because they wanted the USSR to win 50 gold medals at these Olympics, in commemoration of the 50th anniversary of the Soviet Union.

The United States team was the youngest in history. American players usually participated in the Olympics once before turning pro, and the U.S. team always had new players every four years. The 1972 team didn't have a clear leader. A rising star Bill Walton declined an invitation to participate. Nevertheless, the team was heavily favored, featuring such players as Doug Collins or Tommy Burleson (the tallest player among all teams).

The young American team was confronted by a veteran Soviet team, featuring stars Sergei Belov, Modestas Paulauskas, and Alexander Belov. The players had played together for more than seven years. For Gennadi Volnov it was the fourth Olympic appearance.

The Soviets performed strongly at the beginning, winning the first half 26:21. The Soviets kept the Americans 4–8 points behind during the first half.

In the second half Soviets targeted Dwight Jones, as they considered him the leader of the U.S. team. On the 28th minute he was provoked by Mikheil Korkia and responded. Both players were sent off. The Soviets were satisfied, as they deemed Korkia less significant for them than Jones for the Americans. The next minute Alexander Belov hit Jim Brewer during the free-throw, and Brewer was unable to continue playing. According to the Americans, the referees did not notice the foul.

With 10 minutes left, the Soviets increased their lead to 10 points. After that Americans finally started to press the Soviets. It helped them to cut the deficit to 1 point. Soviet players started to feel nervous. With less than a minute left, Doug Collins stole a Soviet pass at halfcourt and was fouled hard by Zurab Sakandelidze as he drove toward the basket, being knocked down into the basket stanchion. With three seconds remaining on the game clock, Collins was awarded two free throws and sank the first to tie the score at 49. Just as Collins lifted the ball to begin his shooting motion in attempting the second free throw, the horn from the scorer's table sounded, marking the beginning of a chain of events that left the game's final three seconds mired in controversy. Although the unexpected sound of the horn caused lead referee Renato Righetto to turn away from the free throw attempt and look over to the scorer's table, play was not stopped. Collins never broke his shooting motion and continued with his second free throw, scoring to put the U.S. ahead by a score of 50:49. Immediately following Collins' free throws, the Soviets inbounded the ball and failed to score. Soviet coaches claimed that they had requested a timeout before Collins' foul shots. The referees ordered the clock reset to three seconds, and the game's final seconds replayed. The horn sounded as a length-of-the-court Soviet pass was being released from the inbounding player, the pass missed its mark, and the American players began celebrating. Nevertheless, the final three seconds were replayed for a third time. This time, the Soviets' Alexander Belov and the USA's Kevin Joyce and Jim Forbes went up for the pass, and Belov caught the long pass from Ivan Edeshko near the American basket. Belov then laid the ball in for the winning points as the buzzer sounded.

Later Olympics
The Americans regained the basketball crown in 1976, but their ability to stay competitive with college players against seasoned professionals from the Soviet Union was decreasing. In 1988, the Soviets beat the United States once again, eliminating them in the semifinals. The 1988 game was a turning point in international basketball. FIBA officials started to realize that amateur rules were extremely unfair, and in 1989, NBA players were finally allowed in the Olympics.

Ice hockey

The 1980 hockey game between the U.S. and USSR was dubbed the "Miracle on Ice", when American college players defeated the heavily favored seasoned professionals from the Soviet Union, on the way to a gold medal at the Winter Olympics in Lake Placid, New York. The Soviet Union had won the gold medal in five of the six previous Winter Olympic Games, and were the favorites to win once more. Though ice hockey is not a major sport in most areas of the United States, the "Miracle" is often listed as one of the all-time greatest American sporting achievements. The U.S. also won the gold medal in the 1960 Games at Squaw Valley, California, defeating the Soviet Union, Canada, Czechoslovakia, and Sweden along the way. However, since this victory is not as well known as the 1980 win, it has come to be known as the "Forgotten Miracle".

The U.S. and the Soviet Union next met at the Olympics in 1988. As in 1980, the Soviets were represented by their star-studded veterans, while the Americans fielded a team of college players. The Soviets won the encounter 7–5 and went on to win the gold medal, while the U.S. placed seventh.

The two teams met again at the 1992 Olympics in a semi-final match. There, the Unified Team (the successor to the Soviet Union) won 5–2. While some stars had left the Soviet Union to play in the NHL, the Unified Team still boasted many veterans from their domestic professional league, while the Americans were represented primarily by college players. The Unified Team eventually won the gold medal, while the U.S. placed fourth.

The U.S. and Russia (the successor to the Unified Team) met twice at the 1996 World Cup of Hockey. The Americans won both games 5–2 en route to the tournament championship.

The U.S., coached by Herb Brooks, and Russia, coached by Slava Fetisov, met twice in the 2002 Winter Olympics in Salt Lake City, which included a 2–2 round-robin draw and a 3–2 semi-final win for the Americans. The semi-final match was played 22 years to the day after the "Miracle on Ice" game. The U.S. eventually won silver, while Russia won bronze.

The two teams met in the quarterfinals of the 2004 World Cup of Hockey, with the U.S. earning a decisive 5–3 victory.

The U.S. and Russia played each other in a round-robin game at the 2014 Winter Olympics in Sochi. The game was tied 2–2 after overtime before the Americans prevailed in an eight-round shootout, with T.J. Oshie scoring on 4 of 6 attempts for the United States. The match has been dubbed by some as the "Marathon on Ice" due to its length. Both teams, however, failed to medal; the Americans finished fourth (losing in the semis to Canada and to Finland in the bronze medal game), while the Russians placed fifth (losing to Finland in the quarterfinals).

See also
List of United States Olympic medalists
United States at the Paralympics
United States at the Summer Olympics
United States at the Winter Olympics
United States at the Pan American Games
Four territories of the United States send independent Olympic teams (American Samoa, Guam, Puerto Rico, and the United States Virgin Islands)

References

External links